Zyayda is an Arabic-speaking tribe of Arab descent in Morocco, belonging to the Chaouia tribal confederacy.

See Also other tribes 
 Sless
 Sefiane
 Maqil
 Beni Ahsen
 Beni Hassan

See also 
 Arabs
 Arab tribes
 Maghreb
 Maghrebis

References 

Arab tribes in Morocco